Frank Chamizo Marquez (born 10 July 1992) is a Cuban-Italian freestyle wrestler who competes at 74 kilograms. Starting his career in Cuba, Chamizo became a World Cup Champion, World Championship medalist and Pan American champion at 55 kilograms in 2010 and 2011, before immigrating to Italy that same year. Since then, Chamizo became the greatest Italian wrestler of all-time, racking up two World Championships (in 2015 at 65kg and in 2017 at 70kg, silver medal in 2019), an Olympic bronze medal in 2016, an Individual World Cup silver medal, a European Games silver medal, four European Championships, in between others. Chamizo is also known for his rivalry with five-time Olympic and World champion Jordan Burroughs, whom he has gone 2–3 against, owning the last match.

Personal life

Chamizo had a trying childhood. He grew up in poverty, and was raised by his grandmother because both of his parents lived abroad. He began wrestling at the age of seven after walking into a wrestling facility out of curiosity. The Cuban government eventually recognized his talent, and helped him attend a secondary school where he could continue wrestling. In addition to his native Spanish, Chamizo is fluent in Italian and can also speak English.

Career in Cuba

In 2010, Chamizo won a world bronze medal for Cuba; he was only 18 at the time. The next year, he returned to the world championships, where he placed 12th. After the 2011 World Wrestling Championships, however, Cuba's wrestling federation suspended him for two years for alleged difficulties with weight management. At a crossroads in life, he moved to Italy, where his ex-wife is from.

Career in Italy

In 2015, Chamizo made his world debut for Italy, and won a gold medal. Before then, no Italian had won a world or Olympic freestyle wrestling gold medal since 1980.

From there, Chamizo went on to win three more world-level medals, including a bronze medal at the 2016 Summer Olympics, and a gold medal at the 2017 world competition.

Overall, Chamizo won four world-level medals for Italy, and two world-level championships.

Freestyle record

! colspan="7"| Freestyle matches
|-
!  Res.
!  Record
!  Opponent
!  Score
!  Date
!  Event
!  Location
|-
! style=background:white colspan=7 |
|-
|Loss
|153–27
|align=left| Tajmuraz Salkazanov
|style="font-size:88%"|7–5
|style="font-size:88%" rowspan=4|March 29–30, 2022
|style="font-size:88%" rowspan=4|2022 European Continental Championships
|style="text-align:left;font-size:88%;" rowspan=4| Budapest, Hungary
|-
|Win
|153–26
|align=left| Hrayr Alikhanyan
|style="font-size:88%"|7–1
|-
|Win
|152–26
|align=left| Soner Demirtaş
|style="font-size:88%"|WO (5–0)
|-
|Win
|151–26
|align=left| Giorgi Sulava
|style="font-size:88%"|10–2
|-
! style=background:white colspan=7 |
|-
|Loss
|150–26
|align=left| Kyle Dake
|style="font-size:88%"|0–5
|style="font-size:88%" rowspan=4|August 5–6, 2021
|style="font-size:88%" rowspan=4|2020 Summer Olympics
|style="text-align:left;font-size:88%;" rowspan=4|
 Tokyo, Japan
|-
|Loss
|150–25
|align=left| Magomedkhabib Kadimagomedov
|style="font-size:88%"|7–9
|-
|Win
|150–24
|align=left| Turan Bayramov
|style="font-size:88%"|3–1
|-
|Win
|149–24
|align=left| Avtandil Kentchadze
|style="font-size:88%"|5–1
|-
! style=background:white colspan=7 |
|-
|Loss
|
|align=left| Mostafa Hosseinkhani
|style="font-size:88%"|INJ
|style="font-size:88%" rowspan=4|June 9, 2021
|style="font-size:88%" rowspan=4|2021 Poland Open
|style="text-align:left;font-size:88%;" rowspan=4|
 Warsaw, Poland
|-
|Win
|148–24
|align=left| Semen Radulov
|style="font-size:88%"|5–4
|-
|Win
|147–24
|align=left| Daniyar Kaisanov
|style="font-size:88%"|2–0
|-
|Win
|146–24
|align=left| Lucas Kahnt
|style="font-size:88%"|7–2
|-
! style=background:white colspan=7 |
|-
|Win
|145–24
|align=left| Razambek Zhamalov
|style="font-size:88%"|5–1
|style="font-size:88%" rowspan=5|April 19–21, 2021
|style="font-size:88%" rowspan=5|2021 European Continental Championships
|style="text-align:left;font-size:88%;" rowspan=5|
 Warsaw, Poland
|-
|Win
|144–24
|align=left| Avtandil Kentchadze
|style="font-size:88%"|8–2
|-
|Win
|143–24
|align=left| Marc Dietsche
|style="font-size:88%"|TF 12–1
|-
|Loss
|142–24
|align=left| Tajmuraz Salkazanov
|style="font-size:88%"|2–6
|-
|Win
|142–23
|align=left| Daniel Sartakov
|style="font-size:88%"|4–0
|-
! style=background:white colspan=7 | 
|-
|Win
|141–23
|align=left| Jordan Burroughs
|style="font-size:88%"|3–2
|style="font-size:88%" rowspan=4|March 7, 2021
|style="font-size:88%" rowspan=4|Matteo Pellicone Ranking Series 2021
|style="text-align:left;font-size:88%;" rowspan=4|
 Rome, Italy
|-
|Win
|140–23
|align=left| Franklin Gómez
|style="font-size:88%"|6–0
|-
|Win 
|139–23
|align=left| Malik Amine
|style="font-size:88%"|13–8
|-
|Win 
|138–23
|align=left| Nurkozha Kaipanov
|style="font-size:88%"|6–0
|-
! style=background:white colspan=7 |
|-
|Loss
|137–23
|align=left| Razambek Zhamalov
|style="font-size:88%"|2–4
|style="font-size:88%" rowspan=5|December 16–18, 2020
|style="font-size:88%" rowspan=5|2020 Individual World Cup
|style="text-align:left;font-size:88%;" rowspan=5|
 Belgrade, Serbia
|-
|Win
|137–22
|align=left| Azamat Nurykau
|style="font-size:88%"|TF 10–0
|-
|Win
|136–22
|align=left| Hrayr Alikhanyan
|style="font-size:88%"|8–2
|-
|Win
|135–22
|align=left| Fazli Eryilmaz
|style="font-size:88%"|Fall
|-
|Win
|134–22
|align=left| Augusto Midana
|style="font-size:88%"|8–0
|-
|Loss
|133–22
|align=left| Kyle Dake
|style="font-size:88%"|3–4
|style="font-size:88%"|July 25, 2020
|style="font-size:88%"|FloWrestling: Dake vs. Chamizo
|style="text-align:left;font-size:88%;" |
 Austin, Texas
|-
! style=background:white colspan=7 |
|-
|Win
|133–21
|align=left| Magomedrasul Gazimagomedov
|style="font-size:88%"|5–3
|style="font-size:88%" rowspan=4|February 16, 2020
|style="font-size:88%" rowspan=4|2020 European Continental Championships
|style="text-align:left;font-size:88%;" rowspan=4| Rome, Italy
|-
|Win
|132–21
|align=left| Murad Kuramagomedov
|style="font-size:88%"|6–0
|-
|Win
|131–21
|align=left| Valentin Borzin
|style="font-size:88%"|8–0
|-
|Win
|130–21
|align=left| Khadzhimurad Gadzhiyev
|style="font-size:88%"|Fall
|-
! style=background:white colspan=7 |
|-
|Loss
|129–21
|align=left| Zaurbek Sidakov
|style="font-size:88%"|2–5
|style="font-size:88%" rowspan=5|September 21, 2019
|style="font-size:88%" rowspan=5|2019 World Championships
|style="text-align:left;font-size:88%;" rowspan=5| Nur-Sultan, Kazakhstan
|-
|Win
|129–20
|align=left| Zelimkhan Khadjiev
|style="font-size:88%"|4–1
|-
|Win
|128–20
|align=left| Daniyar Kaisanov
|style="font-size:88%"|Fall
|-
|Win
|127–20
|align=left| Lee Seung-chul
|style="font-size:88%"|10–2
|-
|Win
|126–20
|align=left| Marc Dietsche
|style="font-size:88%"|TF 10–0
|-
! style=background:white colspan=7 |
|-
|Loss
|
|align=left| Jordan Burroughs
|style="font-size:88%"|INJ
|style="font-size:88%" rowspan=3|July 11–14, 2019
|style="font-size:88%" rowspan=3|2019 Yaşar Doğu Ranking Series
|style="text-align:left;font-size:88%;" rowspan=3|
 Istanbul, Turkey
|-
|Win
|125–20
|align=left| Alibek Abdikassymov
|style="font-size:88%"|10–5
|-
|Win
|124–20
|align=left| Fazli Eryilmaz
|style="font-size:88%"|10–6
|-
! style=background:white colspan=7 |
|-
|Win
|123–20
|align=left| Daniyar Kaisanov
|style="font-size:88%"|6–4
|style="font-size:88%" rowspan=4|May 23–25, 2019
|style="font-size:88%" rowspan=4|2019 Sassari City Matteo Pellicone Memorial
|style="text-align:left;font-size:88%;" rowspan=4|
 Sassari, Italy
|-
|Win
|122–20
|align=left| Khetag Tsabolov
|style="font-size:88%"|5–4
|-
|Win
|121–20
|align=left| Andrei Karpach
|style="font-size:88%"|8–0
|-
|Win
|120–20
|align=left| Isaac Collier
|style="font-size:88%"|TF 11–0
|-
! style=background:white colspan=7 |
|-
|Win
|119–20
|align=left| Zelimkhan Khadjiev
|style="font-size:88%"|8–0
|style="font-size:88%" rowspan=4|April 10, 2019
|style="font-size:88%" rowspan=4|2019 European Continental Championships
|style="text-align:left;font-size:88%;" rowspan=4| Bucharest, Romania
|-
|Win
|118–20
|align=left| Khadzhimurad Gadzhiyev
|style="font-size:88%"|6–2
|-
|Win
|117–20
|align=left| Miroslav Kirov
|style="font-size:88%"|5–0
|-
|Win
|116–20
|align=left| Timur Bizhoev
|style="font-size:88%"|3–0
|-
! style=background:white colspan=7 |
|-
|Win
|115–20
|align=left| Ali Umarpashaev
|style="font-size:88%"|TF 13–2
|style="font-size:88%" rowspan=3|February 28 – March 3, 2019
|style="font-size:88%" rowspan=3|2019 Dan Kolov - Nikola Petrov Ranking Series
|style="text-align:left;font-size:88%;" rowspan=3|
 Ruse, Bulgaria
|-
|Loss
|114–20
|align=left| Jordan Burroughs
|style="font-size:88%"|2–9
|-
|Win
|114–19
|align=left| Azamat Nurykau
|style="font-size:88%"|TF 12–2
|-
! style=background:white colspan=7 |
|-
|Loss
|113–19
|align=left| Jordan Burroughs
|style="font-size:88%"|4–4
|style="font-size:88%" rowspan=5|October 20–21, 2018
|style="font-size:88%" rowspan=5|2018 World Championships
|style="text-align:left;font-size:88%;" rowspan=5| Budapest, Hungary
|-
|Loss
|113–18
|align=left| Zaurbek Sidakov
|style="font-size:88%"|2–3
|-
|Win
|113–17
|align=left| Bolat Sakayev
|style="font-size:88%"|6–1
|-
|Win
|112–17
|align=left| Gong Byung-min
|style="font-size:88%"|5–1
|-
|Win
|111–17
|align=left| Gamid Dzhalilov
|style="font-size:88%"|9–0
|-
! style=background:white colspan=7 |
|-
|Loss
|110–17
|align=left| Nikita Suchkov
|style="font-size:88%"|3–5
|style="font-size:88%" rowspan=4|September 6–8, 2018
|style="font-size:88%" rowspan=4|2018 Dmitry Korkin Memorial International
|style="text-align:left;font-size:88%;" rowspan=4|
 Yakutsk, Russia
|-
|Win
|110–16
|align=left| Israil Kasumov
|style="font-size:88%"|14–11
|-
|Win
|109–16
|align=left| Artiom Postica
|style="font-size:88%"|TF 12–2
|-
|Win
|108–16
|align=left| Alisher Usmanov
|style="font-size:88%"|6–4
|-
! style=background:white colspan=7 |
|-
|Win
|107–16
|align=left| Jordan Burroughs
|style="font-size:88%"|10–10
|style="font-size:88%" rowspan=4|July 27–29, 2018
|style="font-size:88%" rowspan=4|2018 Yaşar Doğu Ranking Series
|style="text-align:left;font-size:88%;" rowspan=4|
 Istanbul, Turkey
|-
|Win
|106–16
|align=left| Saeid Dadashpourkerikalaei
|style="font-size:88%"|6–0
|-
|Win
|105–16
|align=left| Yakup Gör
|style="font-size:88%"|4–0
|-
|Win
|104–16
|align=left| Nurlan Bekzhanov
|style="font-size:88%"|6–0
|-
! style=background:white colspan=7 |
|-
|Win
|103–16
|align=left| Samy Moustafa
|style="font-size:88%"|PP
|style="font-size:88%" rowspan=3|June 24–27, 2018
|style="font-size:88%" rowspan=3|2018 Mediterranean Games
|style="text-align:left;font-size:88%;" rowspan=3| Tarragone, Spain
|-
|Win
|102–16
|align=left| Muhammet Demir
|style="font-size:88%"|PP
|-
|Win
|101–16
|align=left| David Galea
|style="font-size:88%"|TF
|-
|Loss
|100–16
|align=left| Jordan Burroughs
|style="font-size:88%"|5–8
|style="font-size:88%"|May 17, 2018
|style="font-size:88%"|2018 Beat The Streets: Team USA vs. The World All-Stars
|style="text-align:left;font-size:88%;" |
 New York City, New York
|-
! style=background:white colspan=7 |
|-
|Win
|100–15
|align=left| Achsarbek Gulajev
|style="font-size:88%"|TF 10–0
|style="font-size:88%" rowspan=4|May 5, 2018
|style="font-size:88%" rowspan=4|2018 European Continental Championships
|style="text-align:left;font-size:88%;" rowspan=4| Kaspiysk, Russia
|-
|Loss
|99–15
|align=left| Soner Demirtaş
|style="font-size:88%"|3–4
|-
|Win
|99–14
|align=left| Khetag Tsabolov
|style="font-size:88%"|Fall
|-
|Win
|98–14
|align=left| Avtandil Kentchadze
|style="font-size:88%"|9–4
|-
! style=background:white colspan=7 |
|-
|Win
|97–14
|align=left| Magomedkhabib Kadimagomedov
|style="font-size:88%"|10–6
|style="font-size:88%" rowspan=3|March 22–25, 2018
|style="font-size:88%" rowspan=3|2018 Dan Kolov - Nikola Petrov Ranking Series
|style="text-align:left;font-size:88%;" rowspan=3|
 Sofia, Bulgaria
|-
|Win
|96–14
|align=left| Muhammed Akdeniz
|style="font-size:88%"|Fall
|-
|Win
|95–14
|align=left| Dzhemal Ali
|style="font-size:88%"|4–2
|-
! style=background:white colspan=7 |
|-
|Win
|94–14
|align=left| Franklin Gómez
|style="font-size:88%"|4–0
|style="font-size:88%" rowspan=5|February 23–25, 2018
|style="font-size:88%" rowspan=5|XXII Outstanding Ukrainian Wrestlers and Coaches Memorial
|style="text-align:left;font-size:88%;" rowspan=5|
 Kiev, Ukraine
|-
|Win
|93–14
|align=left| Achsarbek Gulajev
|style="font-size:88%"|5–0
|-
|Win
|92–14
|align=left| Taro Umebayashi
|style="font-size:88%"|6–1
|-
|Win
|91–14
|align=left| Andrius Mazeika
|style="font-size:88%"|TF 10–0
|-
|Win
|90–14
|align=left| Gadzhimurad Omarov
|style="font-size:88%"|6–4
|-
! style=background:white colspan=7 |
|-
|Loss
|89–14
|align=left| Zaurbek Sidakov
|style="font-size:88%"|6–9
|style="font-size:88%" rowspan=3|November 17–19, 2017
|style="font-size:88%" rowspan=3|2017 Alans International
|style="text-align:left;font-size:88%;" rowspan=3|
 Vladikavkaz, Russia
|-
|Win
|89–13
|align=left| Konstantin Khabalashvili
|style="font-size:88%"|9–6
|-
|Win
|88–13
|align=left| Magomed Muslimov
|style="font-size:88%"|TF 11–1
|-
! style=background:white colspan=7 |
|-
|Win
|87–13
|align=left| James Green
|style="font-size:88%"|8–0
|style="font-size:88%" rowspan=5|August 26, 2017
|style="font-size:88%" rowspan=5|2017 World Championships
|style="text-align:left;font-size:88%;" rowspan=5| Paris, France
|-
|Win
|86–13
|align=left| Yakup Gor
|style="font-size:88%"|5–2
|-
|Win
|85–13
|align=left| Akzhurek Tanatarov
|style="font-size:88%"|TF 12–0
|-
|Win
|84–13
|align=left| Elaman Dogdurbek Uulu
|style="font-size:88%"|TF 12–0
|-
|Win
|83–13
|align=left| Ikhtiyor Navruzov
|style="font-size:88%"|9–5
|-
! style=background:white colspan=7 |
|-
|Win
|82–13
|align=left| Andriy Kviatkovskyi
|style="font-size:88%"|3–0
|style="font-size:88%" rowspan=4|July 22–23, 2017
|style="font-size:88%" rowspan=4|2017 Ion Cornianu & Ladislau Simon Memorial International
|style="text-align:left;font-size:88%;"rowspan=4|
 Bucharest, Romania
|-
|Win
|81–13
|align=left| Enes Uslu
|style="font-size:88%"|Fall
|-
|Win
|80–13
|align=left| Andrei Zugrav
|style="font-size:88%"|Fall
|-
|Win
|79–13
|align=left| Maxim Fricatel
|style="font-size:88%"|TF 10–0
|-
! style=background:white colspan=7 |
|-
|Win
|78–13
|align=left| Ganzorigiin Mandakhnaran
|style="font-size:88%"|6–2
|style="font-size:88%" rowspan=3|July 6–10, 2017
|style="font-size:88%" rowspan=3|2017 Ali Aliev Memorial International
|style="text-align:left;font-size:88%;" rowspan=3|
 Vladikavkaz, Russia
|-
|Win
|77–13
|align=left| Murad Kuramagomedov
|style="font-size:88%"|12–5
|-
|Win
|76–13
|align=left| Alibek Akbaev
|style="font-size:88%"|TF 11–0
|-
|Win
|75–13
|align=left| Jordan Oliver
|style="font-size:88%"|7–6
|style="font-size:88%"|May 17, 2017
|style="font-size:88%"|2017 Beat The Streets: Times Square
|style="text-align:left;font-size:88%;" |
 New York City, New York
|-
! style=background:white colspan=7 |
|-
|Win
|74–13
|align=left| Magomedmurad Gadzhiev
|style="font-size:88%"|4–3
|style="font-size:88%" rowspan=4|May 2–7, 2017
|style="font-size:88%" rowspan=4|2017 European Continental Championships
|style="text-align:left;font-size:88%;" rowspan=4| Novi Sad, Serbia
|-
|Win
|73–13
|align=left| Adrian Moise
|style="font-size:88%"|TF 10–0
|-
|Win
|72–13
|align=left| Mihai Sava
|style="font-size:88%"|TF 10–0
|-
|Win
|71–13
|align=left| Ruslan Dibirgadzhiyev
|style="font-size:88%"|6–0
|-
! style=background:white colspan=7 |
|-
|Loss
|70–13
|align=left| Magomedrasul Gazimagomedov
|style="font-size:88%"|2–4
|style="font-size:88%" rowspan=2|April 8–9, 2017
|style="font-size:88%" rowspan=2|2017 Dan Kolov - Nikola Petrov Ranking Series
|style="text-align:left;font-size:88%;" rowspan=2|
 Ruse, Bulgaria
|-
|Win
|70–12
|align=left| Vikas
|style="font-size:88%"|TF 10–0
|-
! style=background:white colspan=7 |
|-
|Win
|69–13
|align=left| Gianluca Talamo
|style="font-size:88%"|TF 11–1
|style="font-size:88%" rowspan=5|March 5, 2017
|style="font-size:88%" rowspan=5|2017 Italian National Championships
|style="text-align:left;font-size:88%;" rowspan=5|
 Ostia, Italy
|-
|Win
|68–13
|align=left| Massimiliano Chiara
|style="font-size:88%"|Fall
|-
|Win
|67–13
|align=left| Giovanni Rogolino
|style="font-size:88%"|TF 13–2
|-
|Win
|66–13
|align=left| Davide Turco
|style="font-size:88%"|TF 15–4
|-
|Win
|65–13
|align=left| Davide Giordano
|style="font-size:88%"|TF 14–0
|-
! style=background:white colspan=7 |
|-
|Win
|64–13
|align=left| Khalid Kerchiev
|style="font-size:88%"|TF 10–0
|style="font-size:88%" rowspan=3|February 26, 2017
|style="font-size:88%" rowspan=3|2017 Mälarcupen Fristil
|style="text-align:left;font-size:88%;" rowspan=3|
 Västerås, Sweden
|-
|Win
|63–12
|align=left| Mohaydin Rahimi
|style="font-size:88%"|Fall
|-
|Win
|62–12
|align=left| Asef Khierkha
|style="font-size:88%"|Fall
|-
! style=background:white colspan=7 |
|-
|Win
|61–12
|align=left| Frank Molinaro
|style="font-size:88%"|5–3
|style="font-size:88%" rowspan=4|August 21, 2016
|style="font-size:88%" rowspan=4|2016 Summer Olympics
|style="text-align:left;font-size:88%;" rowspan=4| Rio de Janeiro, Brazil
|-
|Loss
|60–12
|align=left| Toghrul Asgarov
|style="font-size:88%"|4–7
|-
|Win
|60–11
|align=left| Zurabi Iakobishvili
|style="font-size:88%"|4–3
|-
|Win
|59–11
|align=left| David Safaryan
|style="font-size:88%"|3–1
|-
! style=background:white colspan=7 |
|-
|Win
|58–11
|align=left| Mustafa Kaya
|style="font-size:88%"|8–6
|style="font-size:88%" rowspan=5|March 8, 2016
|style="font-size:88%" rowspan=5|2016 European Continental Championships
|style="text-align:left;font-size:88%;" rowspan=5| Riga, Latvia
|-
|Win
|57–11
|align=left| Aghahuseyn Mustafayev
|style="font-size:88%"|TF 11–1
|-
|Win
|56–11
|align=left| Semen Radulov
|style="font-size:88%"|TF 17–4
|-
|Win
|55–11
|align=left| Eduards Frolos
|style="font-size:88%"|TF 10–0
|-
|Win
|54–11
|align=left| Steven Graf
|style="font-size:88%"|TF 10–0
|-
! style=background:white colspan=7 |
|-
|Loss
|53–11
|align=left| Soslan Ramonov
|style="font-size:88%"|7–8
|style="font-size:88%" rowspan=5|February 18–19, 2016
|style="font-size:88%" rowspan=5|2016 Medved Cup and Pahlavani
|style="text-align:left;font-size:88%;" rowspan=5|
 Minsk, Belarus
|-
|Win
|53–10
|align=left| Aliaksandr Kontoyeu
|style="font-size:88%"|5–4
|-
|Win
|52–10
|align=left| Logan Stieber
|style="font-size:88%"|10–8
|-
|Win
|51–10
|align=left| Dauren Zhumagazyev
|style="font-size:88%"|TF 12–2
|-
|Win
|50–10
|align=left| Gamlet Ramonov
|style="font-size:88%"|TF 12–2
|-
! style=background:white colspan=7 |
|-
|Win
|49–10
|align=left| Ikhtiyor Navruzov
|style="font-size:88%"|4–3
|style="font-size:88%" rowspan=5|September 12, 2015
|style="font-size:88%" rowspan=5|2015 World Championships
|style="text-align:left;font-size:88%;" rowspan=5| Las Vegas, Nevada
|-
|Win
|48–10
|align=left| Ahmad Mohammadi
|style="font-size:88%"|Fall
|-
|Win
|47–10
|align=left| Toghrul Asgarov
|style="font-size:88%"|10–5
|-
|Win
|46–10
|align=left| Kim Ju-Song
|style="font-size:88%"|5–2
|-
|Win
|45–10
|align=left| Magomedmurad Gadzhiev
|style="font-size:88%"|4–3
|-
! style=background:white colspan=7 |
|-
|Win
|44–10
|align=left| George Bucur
|style="font-size:88%"|3–3
|style="font-size:88%" rowspan=4|July 24–26, 2015
|style="font-size:88%" rowspan=4|2015 Ziolkowski & Pytlasinski Memorial International
|style="text-align:left;font-size:88%;" rowspan=4|
 Warsaw, Poland
|-
|Win
|43–10
|align=left| Andrey Kviatkovski
|style="font-size:88%"|9–4
|-
|Win
|42–10
|align=left| Rashid Mostoi
|style="font-size:88%"|TF 12–2
|-
|Win
|41–10
|align=left| Soslan Ramonov
|style="font-size:88%"|4–3
|-
! style=background:white colspan=7 |
|-
|Loss
|40–10
|align=left| James Green
|style="font-size:88%"|5–5
|style="font-size:88%" rowspan=3|July 11, 2015
|style="font-size:88%" rowspan=3|2015 Grand Prix of Spain
|style="text-align:left;font-size:88%;" rowspan=3|
 Madrid, Spain
|-
|Win
|40–9
|align=left| Cruiz Manning
|style="font-size:88%"|6–3
|-
|Win
|39–9
|align=left| Airam Gonzalez
|style="font-size:88%"|TF 10–0
|-
! style=background:white colspan=7 |
|-
|Loss
|38–9
|align=left| Parviz Ahmadov
|style="font-size:88%"|Fall
|style="font-size:88%" rowspan=4|June 17, 2015
|style="font-size:88%" rowspan=4|2015 European Games
|style="text-align:left;font-size:88%;" rowspan=4| Baku, Azerbaijan
|-
|Win
|38–8
|align=left| George Bucur
|style="font-size:88%"|5–4
|-
|Win
|37–8
|align=left| Mustafa Kaya
|style="font-size:88%"|10–7
|-
|Win
|36–8
|align=left| Avtandil Kentchadze
|style="font-size:88%"|4–4
|-
! style=background:white colspan=7 |
|-
|Win
|35–8
|align=left| Gianluca Talamo
|style="font-size:88%"|Fall
|style="font-size:88%" rowspan=3|April 11, 2015
|style="font-size:88%" rowspan=3|2015 Segunda Fase Copa Italia
|style="text-align:left;font-size:88%;" rowspan=3|
 Naples, Italy
|-
|Win
|34–8
|align=left| Giuseppe Cristiano
|style="font-size:88%"|TF 10–0
|-
|Win
|33–8
|align=left| Saverio Borsellino
|style="font-size:88%"|Fall
|-
! style=background:white colspan=7 |
|-
|Win
|32–8
|align=left| Zurabi Iakobishvili
|style="font-size:88%"|6–0
|style="font-size:88%" rowspan=5|March 24–29, 2015
|style="font-size:88%" rowspan=5|2015 U23 European Championships
|style="text-align:left;font-size:88%;" rowspan=5|
 Wałbrzych, Poland
|-
|Win
|31–8
|align=left| Magomed Muslimov
|style="font-size:88%"|12–11
|-
|Win
|30–8
|align=left| Maxim Perpelia
|style="font-size:88%"|TF 10–0
|-
|Win
|29–8
|align=left| Norbert Lukacs
|style="font-size:88%"|TF 10–0
|-
|Win
|28–8
|align=left| Randy Vock
|style="font-size:88%"|TF 10–0
|-
! style=background:white colspan=7 |
|-
|Loss
|27–8
|align=left| Ganzorigiin Mandakhnaran
|style="font-size:88%"|3–9
|style="font-size:88%" rowspan=4|March 5–7, 2015
|style="font-size:88%" rowspan=4|2015 Medved Cup and Pahlavani
|style="text-align:left;font-size:88%;" rowspan=4|
 Minsk, Belarus
|-
|Loss
|27–7
|align=left| Magomed Kurbanaliev
|style="font-size:88%"|3–5
|-
|Win
|27–6
|align=left| Aleksander Pauliachenko
|style="font-size:88%"|TF 13–2
|-
|Win
|26–6
|align=left| Malkhaz Zarkua
|style="font-size:88%"|10–2
|-
! style=background:white colspan=7 |
|-
|Loss
|25–6
|align=left| Ganzorigiin Mandakhnaran
|style="font-size:88%"|2–5
|style="font-size:88%" rowspan=3|July 26–27, 2014
|style="font-size:88%" rowspan=3|2014 Kunayev D.A. International
|style="text-align:left;font-size:88%;" rowspan=3|
 Taraz, Kazakhstan
|-
|Win
|20–5
|align=left| Malkhaz Zarkua
|style="font-size:88%"|6–1
|-
|Win
|19–5
|align=left| Kanat Mussabekov
|style="font-size:88%"|TF 12–2
|-
! style=background:white colspan=7 |
|-
|Win
|18–5
|align=left| Aaron Pico
|style="font-size:88%"|4–2
|style="font-size:88%" rowspan=3|July 5, 2014
|style="font-size:88%" rowspan=3|2014 Grand Prix of Spain
|style="text-align:left;font-size:88%;" rowspan=3|
 Madrid, Spain
|-
|Win
|17–5
|align=left| Istvan Nemeth
|style="font-size:88%"|TF 10–0
|-
|Win
|16–5
|align=left| Gianluca Coco
|style="font-size:88%"|TF 14–1
|-
! style=background:white colspan=7 |
|-
|Loss
|15–5
|align=left| David Safaryan
|style="font-size:88%"|6–7
|style="font-size:88%" rowspan=2|May 31, 2014
|style="font-size:88%" rowspan=2|2014 Sassari City Tournament
|style="text-align:left;font-size:88%;" rowspan=2|
 Sassari, Italy
|-
|Win
|15–4
|align=left| Gianluca Coco
|style="font-size:88%"|TF 12–2
|-
! style=background:white colspan=7 |
|-
|Win
|14–4
|align=left| Narek Sirunyan
|style="font-size:88%"|8–0
|style="font-size:88%" rowspan=4|May 24–25, 2014
|style="font-size:88%" rowspan=4|2014 Ali Aliev Memorial International
|style="text-align:left;font-size:88%;" rowspan=4|
 Makhachkala, Russia
|-
|Loss
|13–4
|align=left| Tital Dshafaroyan
|style="font-size:88%"|
|-
|Win
|13–3
|align=left| Ikhtiyor Navruzov
|style="font-size:88%"|
|-
|Win
|12–3
|align=left| Hovsepyan
|style="font-size:88%"|TF 12–2
|-
! style=background:white colspan=7 |
|-
|Win
|11–3
|align=left| Magomed Muslimov
|style="font-size:88%"|8–3
|style="font-size:88%" rowspan=5|February 15, 2014
|style="font-size:88%" rowspan=5|2014 Yaşar Doğu Ranking Series
|style="text-align:left;font-size:88%;" rowspan=5|
 Istanbul, Turkey
|-
|Win
|10–3
|align=left| Aghahuseyn Mustafayev
|style="font-size:88%"|10–3
|-
|Win
|9–3
|align=left| Dovletmyrat Orazgylyjov
|style="font-size:88%"|11–4
|-
|Win
|8–3
|align=left| Ganzorigiin Mandakhnaran
|style="font-size:88%"|10–5
|-
|Win
|7–3
|align=left| Azat Mirakhimov
|style="font-size:88%"|10–4
|-
! style=background:white colspan=7 |
|-
|Loss
|6–3
|align=left| Mihran Jaburyan
|style="font-size:88%"|3–7, 7–0, 2–3
|style="font-size:88%" rowspan=4|September 18, 2011
|style="font-size:88%" rowspan=4|2011 World Championships
|style="text-align:left;font-size:88%;" rowspan=4| Istanbul, Turkey
|-
|Loss
|6–2
|align=left| Viktor Lebedev
|style="font-size:88%"|0–1, 1–1
|-
|Win
|6–1
|align=left| Sarunas Jurcys
|style="font-size:88%"|1–1, 6–0
|-
|Win
|5–1
|align=left| Rahul Aware
|style="font-size:88%"|1–2, 7–2, 4–1
|-
! style=background:white colspan=7 |
|-
|Win
|4–1
|align=left| Kim Hyo-Sub
|style="font-size:88%"|1–0, 2–3, 5–1
|style="font-size:88%" rowspan=5|September 10, 2010
|style="font-size:88%" rowspan=5|2010 World Championships
|style="text-align:left;font-size:88%;" rowspan=5| Moscow, Russia
|-
|Loss
|3–1
|align=left| Viktor Lebedev
|style="font-size:88%"|0–1, 0–1
|-
|Win
|3–0
|align=left| Hassan Rahimi
|style="font-size:88%"|1–0, 2–0
|-
|Win
|2–0
|align=left| Serhiy Ratushniy
|style="font-size:88%"|2–0, 2–0
|-
|Win
|1–0
|align=left| Krasimir Krastanov
|style="font-size:88%"|1–1, 3–1
|-

Awards and honors

2019
 World Championships (74 kg)
 Dan Kolov - Nikola Petrov Tournament (74 kg)
2018
 Yasar Dogu (74 kg)
 Mediterranean Games (74 kg)
 European Championships (74 kg)
 Dan Kolov - Nikola Petrov Tournament (74 kg)
 International Ukrainian Tournament (74 kg)
2017
 World Championships (70 kg)
 Ion Corneanu & Ladislau Simon Memorial (70 kg)
 Ali Aliev Tournament (70 kg)
 European Championships (70 kg)
2016
 Olympic Games (65 kg)
 European Championships (65 kg)
 Alexander Medved Prizes (65 kg)
2015
 World Championships (65 kg)
 Waclaw Ziolkowski Memorial (65 kg)
 Grand Prix of Spain (70 kg)
 European Games (65 kg)
2014
 International D. A. Kunaev Tournament (65 kg)
 Grand Prix of Spain (65 kg)
 Ali Aliev Tournament (65 kg)
 Yasar Dogu (65 kg)
2013
 Henri Deglane Challenge (66 kg)
 Grand Prix of Spain (66 kg)
2011
 World Cup (55 kg)
2010
 World Championships (55 kg)
 Pan American Championships (55 kg)

References

External links
 
 
 

1992 births
Living people
Sportspeople from Matanzas
Cuban male sport wrestlers
Italian male sport wrestlers
Wrestlers at the 2015 European Games
European Games medalists in wrestling
European Games silver medalists for Italy
World Wrestling Championships medalists
Cuban emigrants to Italy
Mediterranean Games gold medalists for Italy
Mediterranean Games medalists in wrestling
Competitors at the 2018 Mediterranean Games
Olympic wrestlers of Italy
Wrestlers at the 2016 Summer Olympics
Olympic bronze medalists for Italy
Medalists at the 2016 Summer Olympics
Olympic medalists in wrestling
Wrestlers of Gruppo Sportivo Esercito
European Wrestling Championships medalists
Wrestlers at the 2020 Summer Olympics
European Wrestling Champions
Doping cases in wrestling